Calciorthid is the taxonomic classification of soils possessing the following properties:
Yellowish to grey colour. (The overall grey colour reflects the deficiency of organic matter)
Poor in nitrogen, phosphorus and potash
Is alkaline, with pH ranging from 7.8 to 8.5.
Are sandy loam to silt in mixture

References 

Pedology
Types of soil